The 2022 Chilean Primera División, known as Campeonato PlanVital 2022 for sponsorship purposes, is the 92nd season of the Chilean Primera División, Chile's top-flight football league. The season began on 4 February 2022 and ended on 6 November 2022.

Colo-Colo clinched their thirty-third league title with two matches to go, after winning 2–0 against Coquimbo Unido on 23 October 2022. Universidad Católica were the defending champions.

Teams
16 teams took part in the league in this season, down by one from the previous season: the top 14 teams from the 2021 tournament, plus the 2021 Primera B champions Coquimbo Unido and the winners of the promotion/relegation play-off Huachipato. The promoted teams replaced Santiago Wanderers, who were relegated to Primera B at the end of the 2021 season, and Deportes Melipilla, who had six points deducted from their 2021 campaign on 13 January 2022 and were also relegated.

Stadia and locations

Notes

Personnel and kits

Managerial changes

Notes

Standings

Results

Top scorers

Source: Soccerway

Awards

Team of the Season

See also
2022 Primera B de Chile
2022 Copa Chile 
2022 Supercopa de Chile

References

External links
Primera División on ANFP's website 

Chile

1
Primera División de Chile seasons